Avalites (also spelled Avalitês, from ) was an ancient port city in present-day Somaliland. It corresponds with what later became  the city of Zeila.

According to the Periplus of the Erythraean Sea,  Avalites was located on the Far-Side market south of Adulis, stood near the entrance of the Red Sea, where the Gulf narrowed at the straits of Bab-el-Mandeb. The port city has been identified with modern day Zeila

Avalites exported spices, some ivory and a little myrrh, but better, the Periplus claims, than that obtained elsewhere. Some of these exports transported on small crafts navigated by local people of the area and was shipped Arabian ports cities opposite of them on the red sea.

The Somali coast was an important part of the global incense trade, alongside Southeast Asia, South Asia, and southern Arabia on the Red Sea. Incense was widely used in the Mediterranean region and all of Europe, used for religious and everyday purposes. This made incense a noteworthy commodity in the Indian Ocean trade.

See also
Sarapion
Opone

References 

History of Somaliland
1st century
African civilizations
Ancient Greek geography of East Africa